Events in the year 1999 in Bulgaria.

Incumbents 

 President: Petar Stoyanov
 Prime Minister: Ivan Kostov

Events 

 Protracted demolition attempts on the marble mausoleum of the first communist leader Georgi Dimitrov become national joke.
Duet Mania, a Bulgarian pop duet is formed in Sofia.

References 

 
1990s in Bulgaria
Years of the 20th century in Bulgaria
Bulgaria
Bulgaria